Haymarket Riot is a Chicago-based post-punk/rock band that was formed in 1999 by Mike Bennett, Kevin J. Frank, Fred Popolo and Billy Smith. The current line-up consists of Kevin J. Frank, Fred Popolo and Brian Wnukowski.

Haymarket Riot features ex-members of Gauge, Traluma, Radio Flyer, Big'N, Sweep The Leg Johnny, Six Of One Half Summers, Just A Fire, Neutrino, Orwell, Hubcap, The Sky Corvair, Dempsey, and the Traitors. Brian Wnukowski also is the current drummer for Cougars. Kevin J. Frank is also the current drummer for Milwaukee's Chariots Race.

Most notable albums are Bloodshot Eyes (2001) and Mog (2004). Since 1999 Haymarket Riot has toured North America, Europe and Japan.

On April 7, 2009, Haymarket Riot released its third full-length album titled Endless Bummer on CD and as a digital download. Endless Bummer (LP Edition) was released on September 29, 2009, with alternate artwork and a download card which contains 2 bonus tracks. Early sessions for Endless Bummer were recorded with Steve Albini at Electrical Audio in Chicago, IL March 8–9, 2008. Overdubs were done from April 7, 2008 - May 27, 2008, at Studio Greg Studios II in Chicago, IL by Greg Norman. Mixing was done November 22–23, 2008, and December 15, 2008, by Greg Norman at Electrical Audio. Mastering was done January 28 - February 8, 2009, by Carl Saff at Saff Mastering in Chicago, IL. The CD version is a limited pressing with hand silk screened covers.

Members
Kevin J. Frank - Vocals, Guitar (1999-Present)
Fred Popolo - Bass, Vocals (1999-Present)
Brian Wnukowski - Drums (2004-Present)
Rob williams -bass ``(2009-Present)` `

Former members
Mike Bennett - Guitar (1999-2002)
Billy Smith - Drums (1999-2002)
Chris Almodovar - Guitar (2002)
Shane Hochstetler - Drums (2002-2004)
Quinn Goodwillie - Guitar (2002-2003)
Michael Graff - Guitar (2003)
Chris Daly - Guitar (2003-2011)

Discography
Albums
Endless Bummer (LP Edition) 9-song LP with download card containing 2 bonus tracks (Divot Records, 2009)
Endless Bummer 9-song CD (Divot Records, 2009)
Mog 9-song CD (Thick Records and Divot Records, 2004)
Bloodshot Eyes (European Release) 13-song Multimedia CD/LP (Delboy Records, 2003)
Bloodshot Eyes 11-song CD/LP (Thick Records and Divot Records, 2001)
EPs
I Know What You Did 5-song Multimedia CD (Stiff Slack Records 2006)
Combined EPs (Self-Titled and Wax! EPs combined) 11-song CD (Divot Records, 2002)
Wax! 4-song CDEP (Divot Records, 2000)
Self-Titled 5-song CDEP (Divot Records, 1999)
Singles
If I Were A Transformer, My Name Would Be Bad Habit 3-song CD single (2008)
Split 7" with Hitch (Figuritas series) (What Else? Records, 2002)
Split 7" with Sweep The Leg Johnny (Makoto Records, 2002)
Split 7" with Her Fly Away Manner (Caulfield Records, 2001)

References

American post-hardcore musical groups
Math rock groups
Musical groups from Chicago
Musical groups established in 1999
1999 establishments in Illinois